The bicipital groove (intertubercular groove, sulcus intertubercularis) is a deep groove on the humerus that separates the greater tubercle from the lesser tubercle. It allows for the long tendon of the biceps brachii muscle to pass.

Structure 
The bicipital groove separates the greater tubercle from the lesser tubercle. It is usually around 8 cm long and 1 cm wide in adults. It lodges the long tendon of the biceps brachii muscle between the tendon of the pectoralis major muscle on the lateral lip and the tendon of the teres major muscle on the medial lip. It also transmits a branch of the anterior humeral circumflex artery to the shoulder joint.

The insertion of the latissimus dorsi muscle is found along the floor of the bicipital groove. The teres major muscle inserts on the medial lip of the groove.

It runs obliquely downward, and ends near the junction of the upper with the middle third of the bone. It is the lateral wall of the axilla.

Function 
The bicipital groove allows for the long tendon of the biceps brachii muscle to pass.

Gallery

See also
 Radial groove
 Medial bicipital groove

References

External links
 

Humerus